Brian Ndzundzu (born 17 July 1961) is a South African former cricketer. He played in nine first-class matches for Border from 1993/94 to 1995/96.

See also
 List of Border representative cricketers

References

External links
 

1961 births
Living people
South African cricketers
Border cricketers
Sportspeople from Qonce